3 Mills Studios is a centre for film, television and theatre production near Stratford in East London. The site of a former distillery in Three Mills became a dedicated centre for television and film production work with the establishment in the 1980s of Bow Studios, Three Mills Island Studios, and Edwin Shirley Productions. In the mid-1990s the three studios merged to become 3 Mills Studios, under the management of Workspace Group.

In August 2004, the London Development Agency acquired 3 Mills Studios. As parent organisation of the Creative London agency, the LDA's role included supporting business and skills, researching industry needs, and promoting London for film-making. The site is now one of London's most important film and television studios.

Ownership transferred to the London Legacy Development Corporation in 2010. The LLDC is the organisation responsible for planning, developing, and managing the Olympic Park after the 2012 Summer Olympics.

Facilities

Stage 5 at  has a similar floor size to the Royal Albert Hall.

3 Mills Studios has a large range of ancillary spaces including; production offices, props workshops, 5 prop stores ranging from 712 to 1,319 square feet (66.14 to 122.53 square metres), make-up rooms, and dressing rooms.

Credits
3 Mills Studios' has become a hub for stop motion animation films and has hosted Wes Anderson's Isle of Dogs and Fantastic Mr Fox, as well as Tim Burton's Frankenweenie and Corpse Bride.

Many feature films have been made at 3 Mills Studios, including Legend,  Topsy-Turvy, Sexy Beast, Eastern Promises, Attack the Block, Berberian Sound Studio, Eastern Promises, Ill Manors, Powder Room, Made in Dagenham, Never Let Me Go, Farming and Lock, Stock and Two Smoking Barrels.

Danny Boyle has also been known to frequently return to 3 Mills Studios and has shot several films at the studios including Sunshine, Trance, and 28 Days Later.

3 Mills Studios' main focus has been on television shows. Credits include RuPaul's Drag Race UK, Giri/Haji, The Third Day, The Great, Year of the Rabbit, Al Murray's Great British Pub Quiz, Cleaning Up, Luther, The Royals, The Rook, The Sound of Music Live, The Million Pound Drop Live, Stand Up to Cancer, Bad Girls and Jekyll and Hyde.

3 Mills Studios has been home to BBC's MasterChef since 2014.

3 Mills was home to Channel 4's Big Brother for the first and second series along with the first series of Celebrity Big Brother.

Many stars from the music world have rehearsed, filmed music videos, or advertising campaigns at 3 Mills Studios, including Little Mix, Calvin Harris, Pink, Dua Lipa, One Direction, Justin Bieber, Jessie J, Paloma Faith, Robbie Williams, Paul McCartney, Miley Cyrus, Beyoncé, Kanye West, Lady Gaga, Katy Perry, Ellie Goulding and Olly Murs.

Other clients include Matthew Bourne's New Adventures, English National Opera, Raymond Gubbay Limited, Shakespeare's Globe and English National Ballet, as well as advertisers for Versace, Audi, Waitrose, Nissan, Gillette, Samsung, Gucci, Topshop, B&Q and Adidas.

3 Mills Studios also housed many rehearsals for the opening and closing ceremonies of the 2012 Summer Olympics.

References

External links

Television studios in London
British film studios
Film production companies of the United Kingdom
Buildings and structures in the London Borough of Newham
Mill Meads